Marya Zaturenska (September 12, 1902 – January 19, 1982) was an American lyric poet, winner of the Pulitzer Prize for Poetry in 1938.

Life
She was born in Kyiv and her family emigrated to the United States, when she was eight and lived in New York. Like many immigrants, she worked in a clothing factory during the day, but was able to attend night high school. She was an outstanding student and won a scholarship to Valparaiso University; she later transferred to the University of Wisconsin–Madison, receiving a degree in library science. She met her husband, the prize-winning poet Horace Gregory there; they married in 1925.  Her two children were Patrick and Joanna Gregory. She wrote eight volumes of poetry, including the Pulitzer Prize-winning Cold Morning Sky, and she edited six anthologies of poetry.

Her work appeared in The New York Times, Poetry Magazine,

Awards
 1938 Pulitzer Prize

Works

Poetry

Editor

Non-fiction
 
 
 Marya Zaturenska, (1949). Christina Rossetti, A Portrait With Background, The MacMillan Company.

References

1902 births
1982 deaths
Pulitzer Prize for Poetry winners
American women poets
Valparaiso University alumni
University of Wisconsin–Madison School of Library and Information Studies alumni
20th-century American poets
Emigrants from the Russian Empire to the United States
20th-century American women writers
People from Shelburne Falls, Massachusetts